Laiaküla is a village in Viimsi Parish, Harju County in northern Estonia. Laiaküla is an exclave of Viimsi Parish, situated between Tallinn and Maardu. As of 2011 Census, the settlement's population was 740, of which the Estonians were 461 (62.3%).
Laiaküla is reachable from the centre of Tallinn by Tallinn Bus Company's route nr. 34A (Viru keskus – Muuga aedlinn), average traveling time is about 29 minutes (the stop's name is Käära).

References

Villages in Harju County